The 15th Golden Melody Awards were held on 8 May 2004 outside the Sun Yat-sen Memorial Hall in Taipei, Taiwan. Overseas guests included Korean artists, BoA, Kangta and TVXQ of SM Entertainment, The Voice Of Asia,Siti Nurhaliza Tata Young and Tsubasa Imai.

Summary
Jay Chou's fourth album Yeh Hui-mei, named after his mother, was awarded Best Mandarin Album.

References

External links
  15th Golden Melody Awards nominees
  15th Golden Melody Awards winners
 

Golden Melody Awards
Golden Melody Awards
Golden Melody Awards
Golden Melody Awards